The South Korean group Winner has embarked on seven concert tours and four Fan Meeting events. The group held their first concert tour in Japan on September 11, 2014.  In 2018, Winner embarked on their first world tour, Everywhere Tour, in support of their album EVERYD4Y, which marked the first time for the group to tour Asia and North America. Prior to their upcoming group hiatus due to military enlistment, Winner held their second Asia Tour, titled Cross Tour, starting off in Seoul on October 26–27, 2019.

Tours

Winner 2014 Zepp Tour in Japan
WINNER 2014 Zepp Tour was a debut concert in commemoration of their Japan Debut Album 2014 S/S Japan Collection.
The Tour had 11 Dates which started from Sept. 11 - Oct. 11, 2014 and gathered more than 25,000 fans.

Winner Japan Tour 2015

Winner 2016 EXIT Tour
EXIT Tour is Winner's first-ever concert tour nationwide following their first EP titled EXIT : E, kicking of the first stop in Seoul on March 12–13, 2016. They also held additional stops in Gwangju, Daegu, and Busan in April. In June, the group brought their Exit Tour to Japan, drawing over 36,000 fans in Japan alone.

Winner Japan Tour 2018 ~We’ll always be young~

Winner Everywhere Tour
Everywhere Tour is Winner's first-ever world concert tour, following their second studio album, EVERYD4Y. The world tour commenced with an opening show in Seoul on August 19, 2018. On November 5, 2018, YG Entertainment confirmed that Winner will be holding an Encore Concert on January 5, 2019, in Seoul. Following the news, on November 14, 2018, it was also announced that they will also start their first-ever tour in North America, held in 7 cities from January 15 – 29, 2020.

Winner Japan Tour 2019

Winner Cross Tour
Cross Tour is Winner's second world concert tour, which was supposed to be held in 9 cities across Asia, including the Opening Act and Encore in South Korea. However, unfortunately the final stop in Singapore and Encore in Seoul was cancelled due to the COVID-19 pandemic, hence only 11 shows was successfully held. The series of events led to the group holding a free online live concert entitled "Winner Cross Special Live" through Naver V Live on February 14, 2020, where they performed live singing and dancing for 2 hours, garnering almost 1 million attendees.

Winner 2022 Concert: The Circle
The Circle is Winner's first full-group concert after their 2-years hiatus, following Jinwoo and Seunghoon's military discharge in January 2022. The event was held on April 30 and May 1, 2022, at the Olympic Park Olympic Hall, Seoul. While the April 30 event was only run in person, the concert on May 1 was also available for online streaming.

References

External links
Official Site
YG Entertainment

WINNER
WINNER
Concert Tours